The Weak and the Wicked (called Young and Willing in the United States) is a 1954 British drama film directed by J. Lee Thompson based on the autobiographical novel Who Lie in Gaol by his wife, Joan Henry, starring Glynis Johns and Diana Dors.

Based on a best-selling book and prison experiences of author Joan Henry, director J. Lee Thompson's prison saga explores the life of inmates behind bars where innocence is lost in the world of vice. Despite its pulpy pot-boiler title, the film settles for earnest social drama over melodrama.

Plot 
Frank "women in prison" story that sympathetically tracks several inmates through their imprisonment and subsequent return to society. Some are successfully rehabilitated; some are not.

Female prisoners talk about the events that brought them there and each of their stories is detailed in a series of flashbacks; the upper-class Jean (Glynis Johns), the brash Betty (Diana Dors) and the pregnant Pat (Rachel Roberts).

Jean has a gambling habit and owes money to a gambling den. Her friend Pam frames her..

The film follows the inmates' progress behind bars; Jean's ordeal improves after some sympathetic bonding with her fellow inmates, followed by a move to an experimental open prison.

Cast

Who Lie in Gaol
Joan Henry was a writer who had connections in society. She had a gambling problem, and was sentenced to twelve months in prison for passing a fraudulent cheque  (she claimed she was framed). Henry wound up serving eight months, at Holloway and the more liberal Askham Grange open prison. At the latter she came under the care of Mary Size. Henry wrote a book about her experience, Who Lie in Gaol which was published in 1952. (The title was taken from The Ballad of Reading Gaol.) The book became a best seller.

Production

Development
The book was read by writer-director J. Lee Thompson, who wanted to turn it into a film. He received backing from Robert Clark, head of production at Associated British. Thompson wound up falling in love with Henry and leaving his wife and two children to marry her.

The British Home Office refused co operation with the making the film because they were unhappy with its depiction of prison.

Diana Dors was cast only a few weeks after having been convicted in real life of stealing alcohol from a friend's house. The role marked a significant change of pace for Dors, who was better known for comedic roles. Simone Silva was another member of the cast better known for glamour roles.

Shooting
The film was shot at Elstree Studios, filming starting on 10 August 1953 under the title Women Behind Bars. Mary Size and Joan Henry were on set as advisers.

Henry thought Johns was a good actor but "a bit goody-goody".

Reception

Critical
The Monthly Film Bulletin said "The treatment of this story provides an unfortunate example of the malaise with which so much British script-writing is afflicted nowadays. The basic situation is promising" but "against these back-grounds are paraded a prize collection of familiar feminine character types (alternately comic, sad and hysterical) – two-dimensional creatures, observed without insight or real compassion."

The New York Times called it "a lukewarm drama".

Variety called it "a safe formula for a box office meller."

The film changed perceptions of Diana Dors.

Box Office
According to Kinematograph Weekly the film was a "money maker" at the British box office in 1954. The National Film Finance Corporation stated the film made a comfortable profit.

It was estimated to earn between $75,000 and $100,000 for Associated British in the US.

Legacy
Joan Henry later wrote the novel Yield to the Night which Thompson filmed with Dors in 1956. Henry and Thompson were later married.

Notes

References

External links 
 
The Weak and the Wicked at BFI
 
Review of film at Variety

1954 films
1950s prison films
1954 drama films
British prison drama films
Films shot at Associated British Studios
Films directed by J. Lee Thompson
British black-and-white films
Films with screenplays by J. Lee Thompson
Films based on autobiographical novels
Women in prison films
1950s English-language films
1950s British films